Interlagos is a neighborhood located in the district of Socorro in the city of São Paulo, Brazil. Its name comes from the fact that the region is located between two large reservoirs, Guarapiranga and Billings, built in the early 20th century to supply water and electric power to the city. The suburb of Interlagos is located in the south region of São Paulo City on the east bank of the Guarapiranga reservoir.

The Autódromo José Carlos Pace itself is still commonly called Interlagos, although that has not been its official name since the 1970s, and it is actually located in the district of Cidade Dutra, not Socorro.

The history of the Interlagos circuit dates back to the 1920s, when the city of São Paulo was undergoing a process of fast urbanization.

Colégio Humboldt São Paulo, a German international school, is located in Interlagos.

See also
 Roman Catholic Diocese of Santo Amaro

References

External links 

  – The official website of the Subprefecture of Capela do Socorro
 Interlagos News
 Gazette of Interlagos
  – The official website of the Brazilian Grand Prix
 Find Interlagos – Find everything about Interlagos
 Interlagos Classifieds - Bars, Restaurants, Pizzerias, etc 
 Roman Catholic Diocese of Santo Amaro
 Autodrómo José Carlos Pace

Neighbourhoods in São Paulo

de:Interlagos